Staying Single When, released in Cambodia's main cinema, 'Kirirom' (now closed) in March 2007 and premiered on CTN, Cambodia's most popular TV channel, in October 2007, is a 100-minute romantic comedy from the production company Khmer Mekong Films (KMF).

In Staying Single When, KMF pioneered the use of "real voices". The normal Khmer movie-making practice is to overdub all actors' lines with Phnom Penh's stable of six voice-over performers, regardless of suitability of age and emotional performance.

Staying Single When has high-quality English subtitles.

Plot
At the launch party of Kep's luxury Beach House Hotel, handsome manager Sarun also celebrates a milestone. He's just earned a big pay rise for his achievements and can afford to get married.

Question is, who to?

Sarun's career has left no time for a personal life. The closest females have been the waitresses at the hotel (not his type) and his efficient assistant manager Somalie (the boss’ daughter) whose arranged marriage to family friend, Neang, looms large.

So how's he going to find a wife? He needs help!

Aunt Towen and Aunt Lye step in. They brought Sarun up after promising his mother on her deathbed they’d organise his life. At first they appear to have struck gold, when they introduce Sarun to a rich friend's alluring daughter Rythika. Sarun is instantly struck and Rythika seems to respond. But she turns out to be a disaster, the first of a string of girls whose loveliness matches their unsuitability.

Sarun's accident-prone friend Otdom, maintenance man at the hotel, considers himself to be an expert in marriage - he has two lovely wives of his own. With the aunts’ efforts backfiring, Otdom takes it upon himself to find the perfect wife for his friend, employing increasingly desperate measures along the way. None succeed.

When Sarun takes matters into his own hands, he is no more successful. Why is this simple task of finding a wife proving so difficult?.

Somalie watches from the sidelines, trying to help her colleague find happiness at the same time hiding misgivings about her own wedding. Bit by bit she falls in love with Sarun, but knows her father expects her to marry, Neang. For his part, whilst growing attracted to Somalie, Sarun never allows himself to think about loving her. He's knows she's unavailable.

Sarun meets Vanny who could not be more perfect for him. Somehow he just isn't interested. What on earth is wrong with him? When the truth dawns, that he truly loves Somalie, he realizes he has to get away from Kep before her wedding. If he doesn't start a new life, his heart will simply break.

Are Sarun and Somalie destined to live apart forever? Or can their love find a way to triumph ...?

Cast
 Meng Bunlo as Sarun
 Duch Sophea as Somalie
 Pov Kison as Otdom
 Chhin Sotheary as Rithyka
 Saray Sakana as Vanny
 Ol Samnang as Neang
 Khem Bophavy as Aunt Lye
 Talong Kanaro as Aunt Towen

Production 
The original title - Finding a Wife - was changed to Staying Single When after the producers realised the parallels between the movie's plot-line and a 1960s song of the same name by a famous Cambodian singer, later a victim of the Khmer Rouge. The movie was first scheduled for production in August 2006. But due to appalling weather in Kep - a small Cambodian seaside town in which half the story is set  - shooting was abandoned after two days. The production was rescheduled for October and November 2006 and continued to completion without further obstacles.

References

External links 
 Staying Single When information on Khmer Mekong Films website

2007 films
Cambodian comedy films
Khmer-language films
2007 romantic comedy films